The upland hornsnail, scientific name Pleurocera showalteri, is a species of freshwater snail with an operculum, an aquatic gastropod mollusk in the family Pleuroceridae. This species is endemic to the United States.

References 

Molluscs of the United States
Pleuroceridae
Taxonomy articles created by Polbot